Bakaldinskoye (Baqaldı) is a rural locality (a selo) and the administrative center of Bakaldinsky Selsoviet, Arkhangelsky District, Bashkortostan, Russia. The population was 621 as of 2010. There are 17 streets.

Geography 
Bakaldinskoye is located 11 km northeast of Arkhangelskoye (the district's administrative centre) by road. Terekly is the nearest rural locality.

References 

Rural localities in Arkhangelsky District